Umm-El-Banine Assadoulaeff (Umm El-Banu Äsâdullayeva) (18 December 1905 – 23 October 1992) was a French writer of Azerbaijani descent who wrote under the penname of Banine.

Biography
She was a granddaughter of Azerbaijani millionaire Musa Nagiyev and daughter of Azerbaijani businessman and politician Mirza Asadullayev.

Banine emigrated to France in 1923 following her father, a former minister in the government of the Azerbaijan Democratic Republic (December 1918-April 1920). She moved to Istanbul where she abandoned her husband whom she had been forced to marry at the age of fifteen and then fled to Paris. There, after many years, literary acquaintances, including Henry de Montherlant, Nikos Kazantzakis, and André Malraux urged her to publish. Banine dedicated her later life to introducing the history and culture of Azerbaijan to France and Europe. Her most famous writings are "Caucasian days" and "Parisian days".

Banine, who was the friend of the German writer Ernst Jünger and Russian Ivan Bunin, tells about her conversion to Roman Catholicism in her books.

Banine published several articles about the situation in Azerbaijan. She died in October 1992. Her obituary in the newspaper Le Figaro called her "one of those personages of La vie romanesque who traverse a century, attracting like a lodestone all the singular figures of their times".

Major works 
  Nami (Nami), Gallimard, 1942. 
  Days in the Caucasus or Caucasian days (Jours caucasiens), Julliard, 1946.
  Parisian days (Jours parisiens), Julliard, 1947, Gris Banal, 2003.
  Meetings with Ernst Jünger (Rencontres avec Ernst Jünger), Julliard, 1951.
  I chose opium (J'ai choisi l'opium), Stock, 1959.
  After (Après), Stock, 1962.
  Foreign France (La France étrangère), S.O.S Desclée de Brouwer, 1968.
  The call of the last chance (L'appel de la dernière chance), S.O.S, 1971.
  Portrait of Ernst Jünger: letters, texts, meetings (Portrait d'Ernst Jünger : lettres, textes, rencontres), La Table Ronde, 1971.
  Ernst Jünger multiple faces (Ernst Jünger aux faces multiples), Lausanne, éditions L'Âge d'Homme, 1989.
  What Mary told me: the tale of Mary's servant (Ce que Marie m’a raconté : le dit de la Servante de Marie), Cahier Bleus, 1991.

References 

1905 births
1992 deaths
20th-century French non-fiction writers
French people of Azerbaijani descent
Azerbaijani novelists
Azerbaijani women novelists
20th-century Azerbaijani novelists
20th-century French women writers
20th-century Azerbaijani women writers
20th-century Azerbaijani writers
Pseudonymous women writers
20th-century pseudonymous writers
Soviet emigrants to France